Sowerbutts may refer to:

 Bill Sowerbutts (1911–1990), British radio panellist
 Joe Sowerbutts (born 1988), British actor
 Joe Sowerbutts (footballer) (1863–1935), Blackburn Rovers football player
 Grace Sowerbutts, the principal witness at the trial of the Samlesbury witches in 1612